La Unión is a city and seat of the municipality of La Unión de Isidoro Montes de Oca, in the state of Guerrero, south-western Mexico. In 2005 its population was 3,079.

References

Populated places in Guerrero